Angus Lloyd was a British businessman and fashion designer. In 1963, Lloyd and his business partner, Henri Strzelecki, founded the Henri Lloyd clothing line in Manchester. Under Lloyd and Strzelecki, the company became known for its pioneering use of new technologies and man-made materials in its apparel, including Velcro, Bri-Nylon, and Gore-Tex.

References

British fashion designers
British company founders
Living people
Year of birth missing (living people)